Marek Krzysztof Koniarek (born 29 May 1962) is a retired Polish football striker. He was the Ekstraklasa top goalscorer in 1995–96.

References

1962 births
Living people
Polish footballers
Poland international footballers
Szombierki Bytom players
GKS Katowice players
Rot-Weiss Essen players
Zagłębie Sosnowiec players
Widzew Łódź players
Wiener Sport-Club players
SKN St. Pölten players
SK Vorwärts Steyr players
Wisła Kraków players
Association football forwards
Polish expatriate footballers
Expatriate footballers in Germany
Polish expatriate sportspeople in Germany
Expatriate footballers in Austria
Polish expatriate sportspeople in Austria
2. Bundesliga players
Austrian Football Bundesliga players
Polish football managers
Sportspeople from Katowice